Anne Margareth Fagertun Stenhammer (born 28 August 1950) is a Norwegian politician for the Socialist Left Party.

From October 2005 to November 2007, during the second cabinet Stoltenberg, Stenhammer was appointed State Secretary in the Ministry of Foreign Affairs.

On the local level she was the mayor of Fauske municipality from 1991 to 1999.

References
Regjeringen.no 

1950 births
Living people
Norwegian state secretaries
Mayors of places in Nordland
Socialist Left Party (Norway) politicians
Women mayors of places in Norway
20th-century Norwegian women politicians
20th-century Norwegian politicians
Norwegian women state secretaries